RGS is the abbreviation of:

 Burgos Airport, Spain, by IATA airport code
 Congregation of Our Lady of Charity of the Good Shepherd
 Raffles Girls' School (Secondary)
 Rapid Global School, Uttar Pradesh, India
 Redland Green School, Bristol
 Regulator of G protein signaling
 Reigate Grammar School
 Remote Graphics Software, remote desktop protocol by Hewlett Packard
 Restless genital syndrome, also known as persistent genital arousal disorder, a spontaneous, persistent, and uncontrollable genital arousal in women, unrelated to any feelings of sexual desire
 RGS Atalanta, a revival of the Atalanta automobile after the World War II
 Rio Game Show, original name of Brasil Game Show (BGS)
 Rio Grande Southern Railroad, reporting mark RGS
 Ripon Grammar School
 Rosgosstrakh
 Royal Geographical Society
 Royal Grammar School (disambiguation), several schools in the United Kingdom